Peter Rost (born 29 June 1951 in Leipzig, East Germany) is a former German Team handball player; today he works as a coach and an official in this sport. His biggest success was winning the Olympic gold medal as the captain of the national team of East Germany in Moscow in 1980.

Rost played for SC Leipzig nationally. All in all, he played internationally for East Germany 216 times, scoring 339 goals. He was in the team that came in second in the World Men's Handball Championship 1974 in their own country. 
As a coach, he was responsible for the women's team from Frankfurt/Oder, the men's team of SC Magdeburg (1998/99) and of ThSV Eisenach (2001–2003). In 2006 he joined the management of German handball club Concordia Delitzsch.

He is married to Christina Rost, who was an international player for East Germany's women's handball team, and who won a World Championship and Olympic silver and bronze medals in the 1970s. Their son Frank did not follow tradition; he played as a professional football goalkeeper for German Bundesliga team Hamburger SV.

External links 
 Peter Rost at Munzinger Archiv (German)
 Als Trainer stehe ich nicht mehr zur Verfügung, in Handballpost ed. 4, 2008

1951 births
Living people
German male handball players
Handball players at the 1980 Summer Olympics
Olympic handball players of East Germany
Olympic gold medalists for East Germany
Sportspeople from Leipzig
Olympic medalists in handball
Medalists at the 1980 Summer Olympics
East German male handball players
People from Bezirk Leipzig